Sylvirana lacrima, the Chin woodfrog or crying stream frog, is a frog in the family Ranidae.  It is endemic to Myanmar.

Scientists consider this frog a sister taxon to Sylvirana nigrovittata.

References

Amphibians described in 2018
Frogs of Asia
lacrima
Endemic fauna of Myanmar